In Search of New Gods is an adventure for fantasy role-playing games published by Games Workshop in 1986.

Plot summary
In Search of New Gods is a scenario for character levels 4-7, a quest to solve the mystery of a turncoat priest who had gone proselytizing to a foreign land, then returned home to convert his own followers to the foreigners' new gods.  There is also another miniscenario.  Both adventures are also suitable for use with AD&D.

Publication history
In Search of New Gods was written by Paul Cockburn with Graeme Davis and Bryan James, with a cover by Peter Jones, and was published by Games Workshop in 1986 as a 60-page book.

Reception

Reviews

References

Fantasy role-playing game adventures
Role-playing game supplements introduced in 1986